The Alton Simmons House (also known as the Alton Simmons Residence) is a Ward Wellington Ward-designed home in Syracuse, New York.

Description and history 
Built in 1912, it is a -story, gambrel-roofed house which includes a Henry Mercer-tiled fireplace and a number of other notable and unique features. It was listed on the National Register of Historic Places on January 24, 2002.

References

Houses on the National Register of Historic Places in New York (state)
Houses completed in 1912
Houses in Syracuse, New York
1912 establishments in New York (state)
National Register of Historic Places in Syracuse, New York